Pará Cuisine refers to the traditional cuisine native to Pará, Brazil. Foods from this region primarily draw influence from Indian, African, and Portuguese cultures. The core ingredients are sourced from the Amazon jungle, and may include meats such as shrimp, crab, seafood, fish, poultry, bush meat, and duck; these are all cooked with leaves (boiled leaves called maniva, chicory, coriander), peppers and herbs. Dishes are cooked in clay pots or barbecued in moquéns (wrapped in leaves and roasted) and soaked in tucupi, a yellow sauce extracted from wild manioc root, native to the Amazon. Dishes may be served in bowls, in containers of clay, wrapped in cocoons of banana leaves, or in urupemas (vegetable fiber sifter).

Ingredients

Cassava 
Withdrawals of cassava flour, the most, appreciated is the manioc flour. Previously, flour water would amount to a wheat bread; a dry flour to a piece of bread, with Carimã would be made porridges and with tapioca, makeup beijus, also known as “tapioca” or “tapioquinha” they have the form like a pancake and can take several types of fillings like chocolate, various types of cheese, jelly (best known as “candy”) as the cupuassu for example, with the most common way of eating tapioquinha is with butter or coconut only. Tapioquinha is often consumed as breakfast or afternoon snack, usually accompanied by coffee with milk. It is a mild taste delicacy, however characteristic and can be found in simple establishments, strollers, snack bars and even there are tapioca houses, snack bars that only sell tapioca with all kinds of fillings. There is also the tucupi, a yellow soup extracted from cassava, which can not be described as its wonderful flavor without tasting it, either accompanied by meat, fish, seafood or pure, almost boiling, with or without jambu. Without mentioning the local delicacy, the duck in tucupi. Initially, cassava and its derivates were only consumed by the poor and Indian people, but over time it has become indispensable at the table of all Pará family.

Popular Dishes

Meat dishes 

 Duck in tucupi: This dish is made of duck, tucupi and jambu (a typical herb from the North region of Brazil). The tucupi is a yellow broth extracted from cassava and that's why it needs to be stewed for a week. Duck, after baked, is cut into pieces and stewed in tucupi where it soaks for some time. Jambu is boiled in water with salt, drained and put on the duck. It is served with rice and cassava flour.

Fruit dishes and desserts 
Desserts in Pará are mainly fruits from the Amazon and liqueurs. Fruits that are part of the regional cuisine are açaí, cupuaçu, peach, guarana and mango, easily found on any street in the state capital. The Cupuacu cream is very tasty, it is made of condensed milk, a cream made of milk and Cupuaçu (sugar is optional). After putting all the ingredients in the blender and mixing them, the Cupuaçu cream is taken to the freezer. The cupuaçu's cream is also used as frosting. Other regional fruits are bacuri, plum, jackfruit, muruci and the sapodilla.

 Abiu: fruit with white or yellowish pulp, sweet or tasteless, it does the lips sticky because the fruit is consistent. We can eat it in nature. The tree (abieiro) bears fruit in July and December.
 Açaí (served in a bowl): the fruit is always present in meals of families from Pará; it represents part of the local economy. It can be served with tapioca or manioc flour. Açaí is often the main meal at lunch – eaten with fish, shrimp or dry meat of ox (called charque) fried. There are two kinds of açaí: the best known, the purple one; and another with a color pulp light cream, the “white açaí”. The tree, açaizeiro, also produces the açaí palm heart (palmito), taken based on its “crown”. Palms heart is frequently used in refined regional dishes.
 Acerola cherry: fruit rich in vitamin C, widely used in juices and frozen desserts.
 Ajuru: is a small shrub with hypoglycemic, widely used in popular medicine. Its fruits have a white and sweet pulp.
 Ameixa (jamelão): is a purple berry, an olive type, you can eat the fruit and make a juice. Care must be taken because it stains and the mouth stays a purple color.
 Araçá: is a small, rounded fruit with seeds and the color of the pulp varies depending on the species. It is part of the jabuticaba and guava family.
 Bacaba: originating from a palm tree of the same family of açaí. It produces a thick juice, used in the same manner that açaí for drinks, sweets and ice cream. Its color is between purple and pink. The taste is softer than the açaí but is less sought after than it.
 Bacuri: is genuinely from Pará. It is much appreciated by everyone in their natural state or the form of ice cream, juices, jams, and dessert the most varied as well as cocktails of the fruit or alcoholic drinks. Specialized restaurants specializing in typical food of Pará have been using Bacuri in the composition of delicious savory dishes in the form of sauces or purees.
 Biribá: is consumed in its natural state, juices and ice cream. Its harvest is from July to September. But can be found throughout the year in popular vacation
 Cupuaçu: The juice of this fruit is a present at the Paranese's table and in any snack bar, or restaurant. It is also very consumed as dessert, ice cream or as a cream.
 Cupuí: This fruit is very appreciated and often used in drinks such as juice and liqueurs. It is found a lot in Belenenses markets from February to May.
 Tapioca flour: It is consumed with açaí as porridge or dissolved in warm milk with sugar.
 Guava: It is consumed fresh or as ice cream or juice. The greens (tips of guava branches) are very used as a tea to combat childhood diarrhea.
 Graviola: It is cultivated in backyards and on large plantations, consumed in its natural state or as ice creams, creams and cocktail leaves under the form of tea.
 Inajá:  It is plentiful in Pará. Fruits are consumed right away or used to sweeten porridges, which are thickened with manioc flour or gum.
 Ingá-vine: Consumed in its natural state is unknown another way to appreciate it.
 Jambo:  The same tree removes sweetened fruits and other very tangy. They are always consumed in natural ways. Also consumed in the jelly's form.
 Jenipapo: it is used to make liquor.
 Mangaba: This fruit has pulp flesh, viscous, with a sweet flavor, acidic, and very tasty. It is ideal to prepare juices and ice cream.
 Maraja: Also easily found on the Marajó Island, little is eaten from it. Its small pulp is thin and sweet. It is commonly sold around March and April.
 Murici: Nominally a tropical tree native to the Amazon, scientific name Byrsonima verbascifolia. The fruit it bears is small and yellow, with a slightly acid but very good flavor, used in juices and ice cream.
 Piquia: More appreciated by low-income populations that consume it cooked, by extracting its pulp straight from the seed, along with cassava flour, or adding the peeled fruit to beans broth, beef stew or rice. Can also be added to black coffee.
 Pupunha: Cooked with pinches of salt, it is sold mainly in the city's popular markets like Ver-o-Peso. However, for some time now, there has been an interest in broadening and enriching the fruit's possibilities by attempting, through handicraft or otherwise, the confection of liquors, ice cream, candy in syrup or paste, all with excellent results. Rich in nutrients, it is also part of the local economy. It has been used in typical restaurants as a side order for beef dishes, caramelized or mashed.
 Tapereba: Very appreciated as a flavor of ice cream, juices, popsicles or any other form of sweets, the high point of tapereba is the famous drink found anywhere from back-alley bars to high-class receptions.
 Tucuma: Contains an exceptional supply of vitamins, being a source of pro-vitamins A and B1, and vitamin C. The people, mainly the stateside and riverside, which certainly consume the fruit often, benefits greatly from it.
 Tucuma-açu: Also called jabarana, is a larger variant of the tucuma fruit (açu being the Tupi-Guarani word for “large”).
 Umari: Native and exclusive of Pará. It is often enjoyed naturally or with cassava flour.
 Uxi: Consumed naturally or with cassava flour, it is certainly an important complement to the caboclo people's meals, as well as among the low-income population, in the capital and major cities. Also found as an ice cream flavor.

See also 

 Amazonian cuisine
 Brazilian cuisine
Pará

Brazilian cuisine